Kimberly A. Zurz (born January 23, 1959) of Akron, Ohio, is an American politician of the Democratic party who served as the Director of the Ohio Department of Commerce.

Career
A graduate of Firestone High School in Akron and attendee of the University of Akron, Zurz served as an assistant to the Summit County, treasurer. She was a member of the Summit County Council from 1991 to 2003, serving three terms as president of the council.

In 2003, Senator Leigh Herington announced his decision to resign early from the Ohio Senate, and the Democratic caucus named Zurz as his replacement. She easily won reelection in 2004 to retain the seat.

With former Congressman Ted Strickland the new Ohio Governor in 2007, Zurz was named a member of his cabinet, chosen to serve as Director of the Department of Commerce. She would serve in the post for the entirety of Strickland's tenure.  With Strickland losing reelection in 2010, Zurz was out of the Commerce Department, however, he posted one last effort to appoint her to another board.  It was announced by the Ohio Senate soon after that Republican leadership would not accept the nomination.

She has since returned to the Akron area.

See also
Politics of Ohio

References

External links
The Ohio Ladie's Gallery: Director Kimberly Zurz

Living people
State cabinet secretaries of Ohio
Democratic Party Ohio state senators
Politicians from Akron, Ohio
University of Akron alumni
Women state legislators in Ohio
21st-century American politicians
21st-century American women politicians
1959 births